Buffalo (Jaques Farms) Aerodrome  is located  north northeast of Buffalo, Alberta, Canada.

References

Registered aerodromes in Alberta